Trick of the Eye (also known as Primal Secrets) is a 1994 American made-for-television psychological thriller film starring Ellen Burstyn and Meg Tilly. Directed by Ed Kaplan, it is based on the 1992 novel of the same name by Jane Stanton Hitchcock. The film originally premiered on CBS as a presentation of CBS Sunday Afternoon Showcase on October 23, 1994.

Plot
Faith Crowell (Meg Tilly) is a struggling bohemian artist who is commissioned to paint a mural for wealthy, reclusive socialite widow Frances Griffin (Ellen Burstyn). Frances wants Faith to paint murals all over the ornate walls of the abandoned ballroom of her ostentatious 211-acre estate. The theme of the mural is to be the grand entrance of Frances' daughter Cassandra at her debutante ball, which also happens to be the night Cassandra mysteriously died.

Faith soon begins receiving expensive gifts from Frances, which she enjoys but doesn't understand why. Before long, Faith starts picking up on several uncanny resemblances between herself and the dead Cassandra. Eventually, she is invited to live in Frances' mansion until the mural is complete, and she discovers a painting of Cassandra and sees the haunting resemblance.

Cast
Ellen Burstyn as Frances Griffin
Meg Tilly as Faith Crowell
Barnard Hughes as Harry Pitt
Paxton Whitehead as Deane
Alastair Duncan as Simon
Romy Rosemont as Cathy Newman

Production
Trick of the Eye was shot from August 8 to August 31, 1994 at Huntington Library in Pasadena, California.

Home video releases
In July 1995, the film was released under the alternative title Primal Secrets on VHS and LaserDisc by Hallmark Home Entertainment and Image Entertainment.

On January 25, 2010, it was released as Primal Secrets on DVD by Echo Bridge Home Entertainment.

References
Trick of the Eye: Miscellaneous Notes at TCM (1994).
Picks and Pans Review: Trick of the Eye by People magazine (October 24, 1994).
Trick of the Eye/Primal Secrets at LaserDisc Database (1995)
Trick of the Eye/Primal Secrets at Amazon

External links

1994 films
1994 television films
1990s psychological thriller films
1990s mystery thriller films
American psychological thriller films
American mystery thriller films
CBS network films
Films set in Long Island
Films shot in California
Films with screenplays by John Gay (screenwriter)
1990s American films